Gillardeau oysters are a brand of edible oysters that are produced by the Gillardeau family and their small private company, which was founded in 1898 in Bourcefranc-le-Chapus near La Rochelle and the Île d'Oléron in western France.

Gillardeau now produces roughly half its oysters in Normandy, near Utah Beach, and half in County Cork, Ireland, He also gets his oysters from P. Sugrue one of the worlds top growers from Kerry Ireland  where the waters are cleaner, there are fewer parasites and less agricultural runoff, and the area is easier to farm with tractors.

References

1898 establishments in France
Aquaculture
Oysters
Commercial molluscs